Sarah Clarke (née Dobson, born in Coleraine) is a broadcast journalist from Northern Ireland, who works at UTV and U105.

Broadcasting career
She is a newsreader and reporter for U105 News and UTV Live.  From 2007 to 2009, Clarke worked as a continuity announcer at the station.

In 2009, Clarke won Broadcast Newcomer of the Year at the CIPR Press and Broadcast Awards.

Personal life
Clarke attended Queen's University, Belfast.  She is married with three children

References

Living people
People from Coleraine, County Londonderry
Alumni of Queen's University Belfast
Journalists from Northern Ireland
Year of birth missing (living people)
Television presenters from Northern Ireland
UTV (TV channel)
21st-century Irish journalists